Morgan Mountain is a summit in the U.S. state of California.

The mountain has the name of the local Morgan family, the first member of which arrived into area in the 1850s.

References

Mountains of Tehama County, California